A private equity firm is an investment management company that provides financial backing and makes investments in the private equity of startup or operating companies through a variety of loosely affiliated investment strategies including leveraged buyout, venture capital, and growth capital. Often described as a financial sponsor, each firm will raise funds that will be invested in accordance with one or more specific investment strategies.

Typically, a private equity firm will raise pools of capital, or private-equity funds that supply the equity contributions for these transactions. Private equity firms will receive a periodic management fee as well as a share in the profits earned (carried interest) from each private-equity fund managed.

Private equity firms, with their investors, will acquire a controlling or substantial minority position in a company and then look to maximize the value of that investment. Private-equity firms generally receive a return on their investments through one of the following avenues: 

 an initial public offering (IPO) — shares of the company are offered to the public, typically providing a partial immediate realization to the financial sponsor as well as a public market into which it can later sell additional shares;
 a merger or acquisition — the company is sold for either cash or shares in another company;
 a recapitalization — cash is distributed to the shareholders (in this case the financial sponsor) and its private-equity funds either from cash flow generated by the company or through raising debt or other securities to fund the distribution.

Private equity firms characteristically make longer-hold investments in target industry sectors or specific investment areas where they have expertise. Private equity firms and investment funds should not be confused with hedge fund firms which typically make shorter-term investments in securities and other more liquid assets within an industry sector but with less direct influence or control over the operations of a specific company. Where private equity firms take on operational roles to manage risks and achieve growth through long term investments, hedge funds more frequently act as short-term traders of securities betting on both the up and down sides of a business or of an industry sector's financial health.

Ranking private equity firms

According to an updated 2008 ranking created by industry magazine Private Equity International (The PEI 50), the largest private equity firms include The Carlyle Group, Kohlberg Kravis Roberts, Goldman Sachs Principal Investment Group, The Blackstone Group, Bain Capital and TPG Capital.  These firms are typically direct investors in companies rather than investors in the private equity asset class and for the most part the largest private equity investment firms focused primarily on leveraged buyouts rather than venture capital.

Preqin ltd (formerly known as Private Equity Intelligence), an independent data provider, provides a ranking of the 25 largest private equity investment managers.  Among the largest firms in that ranking were AlpInvest Partners, Ardian (formerly AXA Private Equity), AIG Investments, Goldman Sachs Private Equity Group, and Pantheon Ventures.

Because private equity firms are continuously in the process of raising, investing, and distributing their private equity funds, capital raised can often be the easiest to measure.  Other metrics can include the total value of companies purchased by a firm or an estimate of the size of a firm's active portfolio plus capital available for new investments.  As with any list that focuses on size, the list does not provide any indication as to relative investment performance of these funds or managers.

See also
History of private equity and venture capital
Leveraged buyout
List of private-equity firms
Management buyout
Private-equity fund

References

External links
Private equity – a guide for pension fund trustees.  Pensions Investment Research Consultants (PIRC) for the Trades Union Congress.
Krüger Andersen, Thomas.  Legal Structure of Private Equity Funds.  Private Equity and Hedge Funds 2007.
Prowse, Stephen D. The Economics of the Private Equity Market, Federal Reserve Bank of Dallas, 1998.

Alternative investment management companies